Nuptial Agreement may refer to:
 Prenuptial agreement, a contract entered into prior to marriage or civil union.
 Postnuptial agreement, similar to a prenuptial but executed after a couple gets married.